La Fornarina (i.e. "The baker's daughter") is a 1944 Italian historical drama film directed  by Enrico Guazzoni and starring Lída Baarová. It is loosely based on real life events of Raphael's model Margarita Luti.

Plot
Renaissance Rome: the young painter Raffaello Sanzio meets Margherita, a girl of the people, makes her his model for the painting "La fornarina", becomes her lover and will live with her. The girl will also inspire some Madonnas, but this relationship arouses the jealousies of a beautiful aristocrat who secretly orders the kidnapping of the girl. Raphael falls into a state of prostration and does everything to track down Margherita; but when he finds it again it is too late because, undermined in physical and moral, he undergoes a collapse that leads to his death, on the very day of the Good Friday procession.

Cast 
 
Lída Baarová as Margherita 
 Walter Lazzaro as  Raphael
Anneliese Uhlig as  Eleonora d'Este
Loredana as Maria Dovizi 
Luigi Pavese as  Sebastiano del Piombo
 Amilcare Pettinelli as  Agostino Chigi
Ugo Sasso as  Marzio Taddei
 Giorgio Costantini as  Giulio Romano
Vinicio Sofia as  Baviera
Cesare Fantoni as  Cardinal Bernardo Dovizi da Bibbiena
 Pio Campa as  Pope Julius II
Nino Marchesini as Governor of Rome
 Amina Pirani Maggi as  mamma Rosa 
 Ernesto Zanon as  Bramante
 Cesare Polesello as Master Timoteo 
Amalia Pellegrini as  Marozia 
Umberto Spadaro as  Client at the Tavern

References

External links

Italian historical drama films
Films directed by Enrico Guazzoni
Biographical films about painters
Films set in the 16th century
Films set in Rome
Italian black-and-white films
1940s historical drama films
Cultural depictions of Raphael
1940s Italian films
1940s Italian-language films